

Arthropods

Insects

Archosauromorphs

Newly named phytosaurs

Newly named dinosaurs
Data courtesy of George Olshevsky's dinosaur genera list.

Plesiosaurs

New taxa

Synapsids

Non-mammalian

References